Alliance Films (formerly Alliance Entertainment, Alliance Communications, Alliance Atlantis Releasing Ltd, Motion Picture Distribution LP and also known as Alliance Vivafilm in Quebec and also known simply as Alliance) was a Canadian motion picture distribution and production company, which had served Canada, the United Kingdom, and Spain.

Because Entertainment One acquired Alliance Films on January 9, 2013, it was dissolved into that company and Alliance Vivafilm was folded into Les Films Séville in 2014. It was one of the major motion picture companies to distribute independent films outside the United States and other countries.

History

Prior to the company (1984–1998) 
The company was formed in 1984 by Stephen Roth, Denis Héroux, John Kemeny, Robert Lantos, Andras Hamori and Susan Cavan as Alliance Entertainment, from a merger of RSL Entertainment Corporation and International Cinema Corporation, with financing from New Century Entertainment's SLM Productions and gave them a $10 million fund.

In 1986, the company had completed the first six projects in the first twelve months, and the company's fare was to be shown on the Big Three networks, namely ABC, CBS and NBC, as well as cable channel HBO and Canadian channel CTV, as well as a financing agreement with New Century/SLM Productions. One of Alliance's well known TV projects was Night Heat, and had to develop several television miniseries.

On September 11, 1986, Alliance Entertainment Corporation is expanding into a package of seven feature films and television projects for the next twelve months, and John Hirsch will made its television acting debut on Alliance's made-for-television movie production, The Sword of Gideon, which will air on CTV and HBO.

In 1987, it attempted to take over the Los Angeles-based production company Robert Cooper Productions, a move that will join the two companies under the Alliance banner, and bring 28 hours of programming donated by Robert Cooper to Alliance, which included HBO projects and several other television films, and distribution of the four Cooper/Alliance joint production ventures would be handled by Carolco Pictures outside of the Canadian market and handled through a $40 million limited partnership with Richard Greenshields of Canada Ltd., which is expected to file within two weeks. The aborted plan for an Alliance/Robert Cooper merger was later scrapped in October 1987. In late November 1987, after an aborted merger attempt between Alliance and Robert Cooper, which end up collaborating on the Return of Ben Casey telefilm, Alliance Entertainment had named Susan Cavan, who was formerly an in-house lawyer to serve as the studio's president, who succeeded Stephen Roth, who was one of the Alliance co-founders, which was ankled to became an industry consultant of the studio.

It acquired a Montreal-based Francophone distribution company, Vivafilm, in 1990. In 1998, it merged with Atlantis Communications, forming Alliance Atlantis Communications.

Later years (2007–2013) 
In partnership with Cineplex Entertainment, Alliance Films (operating as Motion Picture Distribution LP under Alliance Atlantis) also operated Alliance Cinemas, owner of two Toronto-area theatres. During the MPD era, all materials relating to Alliance Atlantis–distributed films contained a disclaimer stating that Alliance Atlantis was "an indirect limited partner of Motion Picture Distribution LP, not a general partner". However, in fact, the company controlled the general partner of the partnership, and hence effectively controlled the distribution unit itself.

Formerly known as Motion Picture Distribution LP, it was rebranded and relaunched in 2007 due to the collapse of its preceding company, Alliance Atlantis, which was sold off piece by piece to CanWest Global, GS Capital Partners, along with several other smaller companies. Société générale de financement du Québec, an investment agency of the provincial government, owns 51% of the voting shares of the company and 38.5% of the equity. GS Capital owns the remainder of the company.

Alliance Films was headquartered in Montreal, Quebec, in the Quartier International.

In the mid-2000s, Alliance Films began to produce films in moderation. In addition to producing films as The Rocket (Maurice Richard) with Cinémaginaire (as well as other movies), National Lampoon's Senior Trip with New Line Cinema and Munich with Universal Pictures, DreamWorks SKG and Amblin Entertainment of and before the days of Alliance Atlantis respectively, they were responsible for co-producing the 2008 teen slasher Prom Night with Screen Gems and Original Film. They also produced and distributed the war drama Passchendaele, and co-produced the comedy Stone of Destiny with Infinity Features Entertainment and The Mob Film Company. They are also responsible for co-producing the 2011 horror film Insidious with FilmDistrict and Wanderlust with Universal Pictures and Apatow Productions.

In 2010, Alliance Films expanded its home video operations with an aggressive push into the TV-on-DVD market. It began releasing various television series on DVD, the majority are Canadian productions or Canadian co-productions. To date they have released over 20 series and continue to release more.

On June 24, 2011, Alliance Films bought Maple Pictures from Lionsgate for a total of $38.5 million before Alliance was folded into Entertainment One in early 2013.

Since early 2010, Alliance Films has been partnering with Jason Blum and his BlumHouse Productions to produce low budget horror films. This began with Insidious which was released in 2011. The next to be released was Sinister in 2012 and Dark Skies in 2013. Since the 2013 acquisition and absorption, it is unclear if eOne will be a partner on subsequent BlumHouse films and their sequels.

On January 3, 2012, it was announced that Goldman Sachs Group is looking to sell its majority stake in Alliance Films.

Acquisition by eOne 
On May 28, 2012, Entertainment One confirmed their bid to purchase Alliance Films from Goldman Sachs Group, similar to the purchase of Maple Pictures a year prior. The acquisition was completed on January 9, 2013; upon the closure of the deal, Victor Loewy stepped down as CEO of the company. eOne also announced that it would phase out the Alliance brand entirely, in favour of solely operating under the eOne banner (Les Films Séville banner in Quebec). eOne and the Alliance Films library was ultimately acquired by American toy maker Hasbro in 2019.

Distribution 
Alliance Films has distributed all or some of the following companies' films before the eOne acquisition.

All listings are from the start of their deal with Alliance up to their current state with eOne:

 Apparition (2009–2010)
 Artisan Entertainment (1998–2004)
 CBS Films (2010–2019)
 FilmDistrict (2011–2013)
 Focus Features (2002–present) (division of Comcast)
 Freestyle Releasing (2006–2012)
 Lionsgate Films (2011–present)
 Open Road Films (2014–present)
 Miramax (1989–2008, 2011–present) (former division of Disney) 
 Dimension Films (1995–2005)
 New Line Cinema (1989–2010) (division of Warner Bros.)
 Orion Pictures (select titles, 1992–1996)
 Overture Films  (2008–2010)
 Relativity Media (2011–present)
 Rogue Pictures (2005–2013)
 The Weinstein Company (2005–2018)

For more, see Entertainment One.

And also, Alliance Films' video releases from 2007 to 2013 were distributed by Universal Pictures Home Entertainment, until the acquisition by Entertainment One.

Divisions 
 Alliance Vivafilm: Francophone film business that produces and distributes feature films in Quebec, folded into Les Films Séville in 2014 after eOne acquired this company.
 Alliance Home Entertainment: Home entertainment division that releases feature films and TV series on DVD.

Alliance Films also operates the following international subsidiaries:
 Momentum Pictures in UK
 Aurum Producciones in Spain

TV series 
The following is a list of TV series that have been released on DVD by Alliance Films:

Animated 
 Beast Wars: Transformers
 ReBoot
 Maurice Sendak's Little Bear

Live-action (with various genres) 
 Adventure Inc.
 Amazon
 Andromeda
 The Adventures of Sinbad
 Adventures of the Black Stallion
 BeastMaster
 Bordertown
 The Crow: Stairway to Heaven
 Dead Man's Gun
 Degrassi: The Next Generation (youth)
 Earth: Final Conflict
 Emily of New Moon (youth)
 First Wave
 F/X: The Series
 Les Invincibles
 The Hitchhiker
 The Hunger
 Lexx
 Mutant X
 Mysterious Island
 NightMan
 Ned's Declassified School Survival Guide (youth)
 Once a Thief
 The Outer Limits
 Psi Factor: Chronicles of the Paranormal
 The Ray Bradbury Theater
 Relic Hunter
 Rent-a-Goalie
 RoboCop: The Series
 Starhunter
 TekWar
 Total Recall 2070
 Trailer Park Boys
 White Fang
 Zoey 101 (youth)

Canadian distribution 
Alliance Films is the official Canadian distributor for the following series:

 CSI: Crime Scene Investigation
 CSI: Miami
 CSI: NY
 Clerks: The Animated Series
 Leverage (S1–3)

References 

 
Entertainment One
Film distributors of Canada
Film production companies of Canada
Mass media companies established in 1984
Mass media companies disestablished in 1998
Mass media companies established in 2007
Mass media companies disestablished in 2013
2013 mergers and acquisitions
Re-established companies